The men's middleweight event was part of the boxing programme at the 1984 Summer Olympics. The weight class allowed boxers of up to 75 kilograms to compete. The competition was held from 30 July to 11 August 1984. 27 boxers from 27 nations competed.

Medalists

Results
The following boxers took part in the event:

First round
 Virgil Hill (USA) def. Edward Neblett (BRB), RSC-2
 Damir Škaro (YUG) def. Ahmed El-Guindy (EGY), RSC-3
 Antonio Corti (ARG) def. Andreas Bauer (FRG), 5:0
 Rick Duff (CAN) def. Brendon Cannon (AUS), 5:0
 Shin Joon-Sup (KOR) def. Patrick Lihanda (UGA), 5:0
 Jeremiah Okorodudu (NGR) def. Pekka Lassanen (FIN), 5:0
 Tom Corr (IRL) def. Arigoma Mayero (ZIM), 5:0
 Pedro van Raamsdonk (HOL) def. Augustus Oga (KEN), 4:1
 Noe Cruciani (ITA) def. Paul Kamela (CMR), 5:0
 Paulo Tuvale (SAM) def. Chris Collins (GRN), RSC-1
 Aristides González (PUR) def. Otosico Havili (TNG), 4:1

Second round

 Moses Mwaba (ZAM) def. Vincent Sarnelli (FRA), KO-1
 Mohamed Zaoui (ALG) def. Tsiu Monne (LES), RSC-2
 Virgil Hill (USA) def. Brian Schumacher (GBR), 5:0
 Damir Škaro (YUG) def. Antonio Corti (ARG), 4:1
 Shin Joon-Sup (KOR) def. Rick Duff (CAN), 4:1
 Jeremiah Okorodudu (NGR) def. Tom Corr (IRL), 4:1
 Pedro van Raamsdonk (HOL) def. Noe Cruciani (ITA), 5:0
 Aristides González (PUR) def. Paulo Tuvale (SAM), 5:0

Quarterfinals
 Mohamed Zaoui (ALG) def. Moses Mwaba (ZAM), 4:1
 Virgil Hill (USA) def. Damir Škaro (YUG), 4:1
 Shin Joon-Sup (KOR) def. Jeremiah Okorodudu (NGR), 4:1
 Aristides González (PUR) def. Pedro van Raamsdonk (HOL), 4:1

Semifinals
 Virgil Hill (USA) def. Mohamed Zaoui (ALG), 5:0
 Shin Joon-Sup (KOR) def. Aristides González (PUR), 4:1

Final
 Shin Joon-Sup (KOR) def. Virgil Hill (USA), 3:2

References

Middleweight